Oswald "Ozzie", "Jake" Jacoby (December 8, 1902 – June 27, 1984) was an American contract bridge player and author, considered one of the greatest bridge players of all time and a key innovator in the game, having helped popularize widely used bidding moves such as Jacoby transfers.  He also excelled at, and wrote about, other games including backgammon, gin rummy, canasta, and poker. He was from Brooklyn, New York and later lived in Dallas, Texas. He was the uncle of activist and author Susan Jacoby, as well as father of James Jacoby, an author and world-class bridge player in his own right.

Early life

Born in Brooklyn to a Jewish family, he was taught to play whist at the age of six and played his first bridge at ten. During World War I, he joined the army at 15 by lying about his age but spent most of his time there playing poker. Dropping out of Columbia University (where he was in the class of 1922) as a math major to become an actuary, he became the youngest person ever to pass four examinations of the Society of Actuaries at the age of 21. Having an exceptional aptitude for mathematics, Jacoby could multiply three and four digit numbers in his head without benefit of paper. During World War II and the Korean War, he applied these abilities to counterintelligence and cryptanalysis being referred to as a human computer; later, he lectured on probability at M.I.T. and wrote books on mathematics.  However, his passion and lifelong focus was games, especially bridge.

Bridge career

By the end of the twenties, Jacoby had achieved fame as a player at both auction and contract bridge, further gaining international recognition when chosen by Sidney Lenz to be his partner in the famous Culbertson–Lenz match of 1931. Jacoby's more aggressive bidding style confused Lenz and Jacoby withdrew after Lenz's criticism. Years later the analyst Terence Reese wrote, "That the Culbertsons did not win more easily ... was due to the fact that Jacoby was a player of quite different class from any of the others". Jacoby subsequently solidified his position as the most successful tournament player in the thirties as a member of the famous "Four Horsemen" from 1931 to 1933 and the "Four Aces" from 1933 to 1941, dominating tournament play. He is recognized by the American Contract Bridge League (ACBL) as Life Master #2, one of ten named in 1936. LM #1 is David Burnstine, his partner on the Four Horsemen and co-founder of the Four Aces.

He pioneered many bidding ideas, including the Jacoby transfer and Jacoby 2NT bids. Throughout his career, he also worked as a bridge columnist; a prolific writer, he wrote over 10,000 newspaper articles on bridge, and his many books include not only bridge but volumes on poker, gin rummy, canasta, and the mathematics of card games and gambling, which he played at high stakes.  He also released a record titled How to Win at Championship Bridge.

Jacoby captained the North American and US teams that won the Bermuda Bowl in both 1970 and 1971. During a long playing career, he won tournaments with many partners including his son and co-author, James Jacoby (1933–1991), as well as his wife of more than 50 years, Mary Zita Jacoby. Terminally ill, his final tournament victory came in a major event at the ACBL North American Bridge Championships late in 1983, as a member of the team-of four champions for the Reisinger trophy with Edgar Kaplan, Norman Kay, Bill Root and Richard Pavlicek. In the same year, he was named Personality of the Year by the international bridge writers (Charles H. Goren Award).  He died at his Dallas home of cancer on June 27, 1984.

Jacoby, Lenz, and Milton Work were named to its hall of fame by The Bridge World in 1965, which brought the number of members to six. They were all made founding members of the ACBL Hall of Fame in 1995.

Other games

A poker player and author on the subject, Jacoby was convicted of a gambling charge in 1944 while in the navy, but acquitted of a charge of conduct unbecoming an officer and a gentleman. Although he did not pursue a career in competitive chess, and did not write on the game, he was nevertheless a strong player.  When in college,  Jacoby beat US chess champion Frank Marshall, and in 1963, in a rapid-transit game, he played a draw with Tigran Petrosian, the then world champion.

Jacoby was also an expert backgammon player, and in 1972 he was crowned World Backgammon Champion. In 1970, he wrote The Backgammon Book with John R. Crawford, which is considered the first book to deal with backgammon from an analytical viewpoint. The Jacoby Rule, which states that in money play gammons and backgammons count only after the cube has been turned, is named after him.

He wrote several books on various card games, with a particular interest in gin rummy and canasta.

Bridge accomplishments

Honors
 ACBL Hall of Fame, 1965

 ACBL Honorary Member of the Year 1967
 Honorary World Bridge Federation Grand Master

Awards
 Charles H. Goren Award (Personality of the Year), 1983, from the International Bridge Press Association
 McKenney Trophy 1959, 1961, 1962, 1963
 Herman Trophy 1960

Wins
 IBL World Championship (1) 1935
 North American Bridge Championships (31)
 Vanderbilt (7) 1931, 1934, 1935, 1937, 1938, 1946, 1965
 Asbury Park Trophy (now Spingold) (4) 1931, 1932, 1933, 1937
 Masters Teams-of-Four (now Spingold) (2) 1934, 1936
 Spingold (5) 1938, 1939, 1945, 1950, 1959
 Chicago (now Reisinger) (1) 1955
 Reisinger (1) 1983
 Men's Board-a-Match Teams (2) 1952, 1959
 Master Mixed Teams (1) 1968
 Life Master Pairs (1) 1936
 Fall National Open Pairs (2) 1935, 1960
 Open Pairs (1) 1964
 Men's Pairs (3) 1934, 1939, 1949
 Master Individual (1) 1935
 United States Bridge Association (5)
 Grand National Open Teams (3) 1934, 1935, 1937
 Open Pairs (2) 1936, 1937
 American Bridge League (2)
 Men's Teams (2) 1931, 1932

Runners-up
 North American Bridge Championships (21)
 Vanderbilt (3) 1930, 1941, 1949
 Spingold (4) 1941, 1948, 1949, 1957
 Chicago (now Reisinger) (5) 1931, 1932, 1939, 1956, 1960
 Men's Board-a-Match Teams (2) 1954, 1956
 Master Mixed Teams (2) 1935, 1941
 Life Master Pairs (2) 1939, 1941
 Fall National Open Pairs (1) 1932
 Hilliard Mixed Pairs (2) 1931, 1939

Publications
 
Bridge
 438 pages.
 492 pages.
 302 pages.
 96 pages.
 158 pages.
 32 pages.

 31 pages.
 64 pages.
 32 pages.
 The Complete Book of Duplicate Bridge (1965).
 222 pages.
 128 pages.
 Jacoby Transfer Bids (1981).
 Major Suit Raises (1981).
 140 pages.

Poker
 Poker, 1940
 Oswald Jacoby on Poker. Revised edition, 1948
 Winning poker, 1949
 Oswald Jacoby on Poker (1981), 

Backgammon
 The Backgammon Book (with John R. Crawford), 1970, 

Rummy
 Laws of Oklahoma, 1946
 Oswald Jacoby on Gin Rummy, etc., 1947
 Oswald Jacoby on Oklahoma, the wild, wild rummy game, 1948
 How to Win at Gin Rummy, 1959

Canasta
 Oswald Jacoby's Complete Canasta, 1950
 How to win at canasta, 1951

Other card games
 The book of card game rules and strategies, 1989
 The fireside book of cards, 1957
 Oswald Jacoby on Gambling, 1963,
 New Recreations with Magic Squares (with William H. Benson), 1976
 Jacoby on card games, 1986
 Magic cubes : new recreations, 1981

Mathematics
 Intriguing Mathematical Problems (with William H. Benson), 1996
 How to figure the odds, 1947
 Mathematics for pleasure, 1962

See also
 Four Aces

Notes

References

External links
 
 
 
 Biography at Bridge Bum 
  at Bridge Guys
 
 

1902 births
1984 deaths
20th-century American Jews
American actuaries
American backgammon players
American contract bridge players
American gin players
Columbia College (New York) alumni
Contract bridge writers
Jewish American sportspeople
Jewish American writers
Mathematicians from New York (state)
People from Brooklyn
People from Dallas